The AFL Umpires Association (AFLUA) is the representative body for Australian Football League umpires.

History
The AFLUA was founded in 1909. The Association's current (as of 2021) CEO is Rob Kerr. Past CEOs include Bill Deller and R. A. Anderson.

References

Umpires Association
Umpires Association
Umpires Association
Organizations established in 1909
1909 establishments in Australia